Talarpey Rural District is a rural district (dehestan) in the Central District of Simorgh County, Mazandaran Province, Iran. At the 2006 census, its population was 6,333, in 1,706 families. The rural district has 20 villages.

References 

Rural Districts of Mazandaran Province
Simorgh County